The North Carolina–NC State rivalry, also known as the Carolina–State Game, North Carolina–NC State game, NCSU–UNC game, and other similar permutations, is an ongoing series of athletic competitions between the University of North Carolina at Chapel Hill Tar Heels and North Carolina State University Wolfpack. The intensity of the game is driven by the universities' similar sizes, the fact the schools are separated by only 25 miles, and the large number of alumni that live within the state's borders. Both are charter members of the Atlantic Coast Conference (ACC) and are part of the Tobacco Road schools. The most popular games between the two are in football, basketball, and baseball.

In football, when the current structure of the ACC's divisional system was implemented, North Carolina and NC State were matched up as permanent partners so as to allow both schools to face each other annually despite being in different divisions. NC State is in the conference's Atlantic Division and North Carolina is in the Coastal Division. The annual football game between both schools is the biggest in the state of North Carolina every year.

Both schools are also known for their basketball history. They have won eight national championships between them (North Carolina 6, NC State 2), and 28 of the past 58 ACC Tournaments (North Carolina 18, NC State 10). North Carolina and NC State are 2 of the 15 college programs that can claim multiple national titles in men's college basketball. In recent years, Tar Heel basketball players and fans have often insisted that the Wolfpack are not true rivals in basketball due to the Tar Heels' recent dominance, saying that UNC's only true rivalry is the North Carolina-Duke rivalry.

However, there are varying opinions about the rivalry with those affiliated with North Carolina. Former North Carolina basketball coach, Roy Williams, has a special hatred for all things related to NC State.  Plenty of articles have been written about Williams' intense hatred for the Wolfpack, underlining the significance of the rivalry for the fans and alumni of both schools who work, eat, and live together throughout the state of North Carolina.

Oddly enough, the ACC has split the two in baseball so that the two schools did not meet in the 2014 regular season; the result of that split was the ACC reinstating permanent partners for baseball in 2015. In the interim, the two schools agreed to a nonconference neutral-site game in Durham.  NC State and North Carolina will face off in a 3 game series in Chapel Hill during the 2023 season.

Men's basketball all-time series records
Listed by number of games won.

All-time series record
North Carolina: 162; NC State: 80

By location
In Chapel Hill: North Carolina: 45; NC State: 11
At Carmichael Auditorium: North Carolina 18; NC State: 4
At Smith Center: North Carolina: 29; NC State: 7
In Raleigh: North Carolina: 61; NC State: 47
At Reynolds Coliseum: North Carolina: 29; NC State: 29
At ESA/RBC/PNC: North Carolina: 17; NC State: 6
At neutral site: North Carolina: 18; NC State: 9

By Titles
NCAA Championships: North Carolina: 6 (1957, 1982, 1993, 2005, 2009, 2017); NC State: 2 (1974, 1983)
Southern Conference Tournament: NC State: 7; North Carolina: 3
Dixie Classic: NC State: 7; North Carolina: 3
Big Four Tournament: NC State: 3; North Carolina: 2
ACC Tournament: North Carolina: 18; NC State: 10

By Final Four appearances
North Carolina: 21; NC State: 3

By coach

North Carolina coaches 
Frank McGuire: 13–9
Dean Smith: 60–30
Bill Guthridge: 6–1
Matt Doherty: 2–4
Roy Williams: 33–5 (38–5 overall)
Hubert Davis: 3-1

NC State coaches 
Everett Case: 25–19
Press Maravich: 2–2
Norm Sloan: 13–26
Jim Valvano: 7–18
Les Robinson: 5–7
Herb Sendek: 5–17
Sidney Lowe: 1–10
Mark Gottfried: 2–10
Kevin Keatts: 3–9

By decade

Other
Listed by score.
North Carolina's largest victory margin: 107–56 (January 8, 2017)
NC State's largest victory margin: 79–39 (February 19, 1949)

Scores of games (1998–Present)
Winning team is shown in bold.  Ranking of the team at the time of the game by the AP poll is shown in parenthesis next to the team name (failure to list AP ranking does not necessarily mean the team was not ranked at the time of the game).

Football all-time series records

Listed by number of games won.
Current streak: 2 – NC State won in 2021 and 2022.
 All-time record 
North Carolina: 68; NC State: 38; Ties: 6 
 Record in ACC (1953–2022): North Carolina: 37; NC State: 33
 Record in Kenan Memorial Stadium:  North Carolina: 28; NC State: 20; Ties: 1
 Record in Carter–Finley Stadium North Carolina: 13; NC State: 14
 Record in Chapel Hill, NC:  North Carolina leads 35–20–2
 Record in Charlotte, NC:  North Carolina leads 2–0
 Record in Raleigh, NC:  North Carolina leads 29–19–4

Largest victory margins
Listed by score.
 NC State's largest victory margin: 45 points, score: 48–3 (October 15, 1988)
 North Carolina's largest victory margin: 44 points, score: 44–0 (October 12, 1894)

Conference Championships
NC State 11 (7 ACC, 3 SAIAA, 1 Southern Conference)
North Carolina 9 (4 Southern Conference, 5 ACC)

Bowl Record
NC State 17–16–1 (.515)
North Carolina 15–21 (.417)

All time records
North Carolina 721–564–54 (.561)
NC State 631–596–55 (.514)

Game results since 2000

Baseball All-Time Series Records

All-Time Series Record
 North Carolina: 168; NC State: 135; Ties: 1
As of May, 2019

ACC Regular Season Championships
 North Carolina: 13 (1960, 1964, 1966, 1969, 1980, 1983, 1984, 1989, 1990, 2006, 2007, 2009, 2013)
 NC State: 1 (1968)

ACC Tournament Championships
 North Carolina: 8 (1982,1983,1984, 1990, 2007, 2013, 2019, 2022)
 NC State: 4 (1973, 1974, 1975, 1992)

College World Series appearances 
 North Carolina: 11 (1960, 1966, 1978, 1989, 2006, 2007, 2008, 2009, 2011, 2013, 2018)
 NC State: 3 (1968, 2013, 2021)

College World Series Victories 
 North Carolina: 16
 NC State: 5

National Title Game/Series Appearances 
 North Carolina: 2 (2006, 2007)
 NC State: 0

Men's Soccer All-Time Series Records

All-Time Series Record
 North Carolina: 55; NC State: 22; Ties: 12
As of October, 2018

ACC Regular Season Championships
 North Carolina: 4 (2000, 2011, 2012, 2016)
 NC State: 1 (1994)

ACC Tournament Championships
 North Carolina: 3 (1987, 2000, 2011)
 NC State: 1 (1990)

College Cup Appearances 
 North Carolina: 8 (1987, 2001, 2008, 2009, 2010, 2011, 2016, 2017)
 NC State: 1 (1990)

National Titles 
 North Carolina: 2 (2001, 2011)
 NC State: 0

References

College basketball rivalries in the United States
NC State Wolfpack
University of North Carolina at Chapel Hill rivalries
College sports in North Carolina